Rael Artel (born February 11, 1980) is an Estonian art writer, curator and gallerist. Since 2013, she has been the director of Tartu Art Museum in Estonia.

Biography 
Rael Artel graduated from Estonian Academy of Arts in 2003. In 2004–2005 she studied curating in De Appel Art Center in Amsterdam. In 2009 she defended her M.A. thesis on criticism of nationalism in the Eastern European art in 2000–2008 in Estonian Academy of Arts.

From 2004 to 2009, Artel owned an independent art gallery named Rael Artel Gallery: Non-Profit Project Space. In 2004–2008, it was based in Pärnu, while from March 2006 to January 9, 2009 it had a branch in Tartu, in the building of Tartu City Library.

In 2007 she initiated a project called Public Preparation, a networking and knowledge collection platform for modern European art. Since 2008, exhibitions and seminars have been held using that framework.

In 2010–2015, Rael Artel was the artistic director of ART IST KUKU NU UT, an annual festival of modern art held in Tartu. She has also held lectures in Estonian Academy of Arts.

In March 2013, Artel became the director of Tartu Art Museum.

Work as a curator 
Since 2000, Rael Artel has been a curator in Estonia, Warsawa, Lisbon, Amsterdam and New York City. Amongst those are Let's talk about nationalism! Between Ideology and Identity in Kumu (2010), Lost in Transition in Contemporary Art Museum of Estonia (2011), Art Must Be Beautiful. Selections by Marina Abramović in Tartu Art Museum (2011), Life in the Forest in Arsenal Gallery in Białystok (2011), After Socialist Statues in the modern art center KIM? in Riga (2011), Explosion in Pärnu and Old News in Kumu as part of the exhibition Archaeology and the future of Estonian art scenes (2012), 's How to Wear Red? in Tartu Art Museum (2013) ning My Poland. On Recalling and Forgetting in Tartu Art Museum (2015). In 2012, Rael Artel and Kaisa Eiche (:et) were curators for an exhibition of the most scandalous works in modern Estonian art MÖH? FUI! ÖÄK! OSSA! VAU! in Tartu Art Museum.

In January 2016, Rael Artel was awarded the yearly prize of Cultural Endowment of Estonia for her work as a curator and as a museum director.

References

Further reading
 Interview with Rael Artel, Director of Tartu Art Museum, Estonia Artvehicle 67
 Rael Artel Art Ist Kuku Nu Ut (short bio)
 Rael Artel HIAP (short bio)
 Public Preparation
  Carl-Dag Lige "TERAVAD TEEMAD: Kumu kunstimuuseumis on Rael Arteli kureeritud rahvusvaheline nüüdiskunsti näitus “Räägime rahvuslusest! Ideoloogia ja identiteedi vahel”" Keskus, 12 April 2010* 
"Rael Arteli tasakaaluharjutused" Eesti Päevaleht, 5 January 2013
  Tartu kunstimuuseumi direktor Rael Artel: lõpuks ometi räägitakse! ERR, 30.01.2014
  Mari Kartau Rael Artel: Tegelikult on maailm suurem kui Eesti ja Tartu ERR, 30.09.2014

Estonian art dealers
Art writers
Estonian curators
Museum directors
Women museum directors
1980 births
Living people
Estonian Academy of Arts alumni
People from Tartu